KN motif and ankyrin repeat domain-containing protein 1 is a protein that in humans is encoded by the KANK1 gene.

This gene encodes a protein containing four ankyrin repeat domains in its C-terminus. The suggested role for this protein is in tumorigenesis of renal cell carcinoma. 
Two alternatively spliced transcript variants encoding different isoforms have been identified.

References

External links

Further reading